George Sea Shanklin (December 23, 1807 – April 1, 1883) was a U.S. Representative from Kentucky.

Born in Jessamine County, Kentucky, Shanklin attended a private school at Nicholasville, Kentucky.
He studied law.
He was admitted to the bar and commenced practice in Nicholasville.
He served as member of the State house of representatives in 1838 and 1844.
He was appointed Commonwealth attorney in 1854.
He was again a member of the State house of representatives, and served from 1861 to 1865.

Shanklin was elected as a Democrat to the Thirty-ninth Congress (March 4, 1865 – March 3, 1867).
He retired to his farm in Jessamine County, where he died April 1, 1883.
He was interred at Lexington Cemetery.

References

1807 births
1883 deaths
Democratic Party members of the Kentucky House of Representatives
Democratic Party members of the United States House of Representatives from Kentucky
19th-century American politicians